Field hockey was contested for men only at the 1958 Asian Games in Tokyo, Japan between 25 May and 30 May 1958 with five teams participating in a round robin competition.

After ten matches, Pakistan finished on top of the table with a higher goal difference over India to secure the gold medal. India finished with the silver medal while South Korea got the bronze medal.

Medalists

Results

Standings

Matches

References
 Men Field Hockey Asia Games 1958 Tokyo (JPN)

External links
Asian Games History

 
1958 Asian Games events
1958
Asian Games
1958 Asian Games